Ponderosa may refer to:

Places
 Ponderosa, California, a census-designated place in Tulare County, California, United States
 Ponderosa, New Mexico, a census-designated place in Sandoval County, New Mexico, United States
 Village of Ponderosa, a New Urbanism-inspired community in West Des Moines, Iowa, United States

Entertainment
 Fictional family of drug aficionados, punks, and cats, on the show It's Always Sunny In Philadelphia
 Ponderosa (TV series), a 2001–2002 television series that was the prequel to Bonanza
 Ponderosa, fictional ranch bordering the northeast side of Lake Tahoe in the American television series Bonanza
 Ponderosa, a title used for reruns of the American television series Bonanza during the summer of 1972
 Ponderosa, an American Southern rock band
 Ponderosa, a track on the album Maxinquaye by Tricky

Schools
 Ponderosa Elementary School (South San Francisco), an elementary school located in South San Francisco, California, United States
 Ponderosa High School (California), a member of the El Dorado Union High School District in Shingle Springs, California, United States
 Ponderosa High School (Colorado),  a public high school in Parker, Colorado, United States

Plants
 Ponderosa pine, a widespread and variable pine native to western North America

Other
 Ponderosa (Sheffield), an open space / recreation area in Sheffield, England
 Ponderosa (typeface), Adobe's version of French Clarendon XXX Condensed
 Ponderosa lemon (limon × medica), a citrus species thought to be a hybrid of a lemon and a citron
 Ponderosa Lodge, an historic lodge in Black Forest, Colorado
 Ponderosa Park (disambiguation)
 Ponderosa Ranch, a real-life amusement park which was located on the set of the fictitious setting of the television series Bonanza
 Ponderosa Ranch Airport, a private airport located 7 miles south of Seneca in Grant County, Oregon, United States
 Ponderosa Steakhouse, a restaurant chain that primarily serves steaks
 Ponderosa Stomp, an annual American roots music festival dedicated to recognizing the architects of rock-n-roll, blues, jazz, country, swamp pop and soul music
 Ponderosa Sun Club, a nudist resort in Roselawn, Indiana, United States

See also 
 Ponterosa, a 2001 Finnish film